Kyric McGowan (born November 1, 1999) is an American football wide receiver for the Washington Commanders of the National Football League (NFL).

Early life and education
McGowan was born on November 1, 1999, in Dalton, Georgia, where he grew up. He attended Dalton High School, where he played football, baseball, and track and field. As a senior in football, he was team captain and helped lead the team to the number one Georgia 6-A State ranking. He was an honorable mention all-state honoree and was first-team all-region and all-area.

A three-star recruit, McGowan committed to play college football at Northwestern. In 2017, he was one of 13 true freshmen to see regular season game action, appearing in 11 games and recording five receptions for 51 yards. As a sophomore in 2018, he recorded 16 catches for 283 yards and scored two touchdowns, while playing in all 13 games. As a junior, he was a starter in all nine games in which he appeared, and finished the year with 13 receptions for 102 yards, in addition to 177 rushing yards and one score. In 2020, he appeared in eight matches and made 34 receptions for 366 yards.

Near the end of the 2020 season, McGowan announced that he was going to transfer to Georgia Tech for a super senior season after all players were given an extra year of eligibility due to the COVID-19 pandemic. In his lone season at Georgia Tech, he played in 11 games, 10 as a starter, and tied for the team lead in receptions with 37, while placing third on the team with 467 yards and scoring seven touchdowns. His touchdown total led Georgia Tech and placed eighth in the conference. At the end of the year, he was named academic all-conference.

Professional career
McGowan signed with the Washington Commanders as an undrafted free agent in May 2022. He was waived on August 30, 2022, but re-signed to the practice squad the following day. He was activated from the practice squad for their game against the Green Bay Packers, appearing on 13 combined offensive and special team plays. He signed a reserve/future contract on January 9, 2023.

References

External links
 Washington Commanders bio
 Georgia Tech Yellow Jackets bio
 Northwestern Wildcats bio

1999 births
Living people
American football wide receivers
People from Dalton, Georgia
Northwestern Wildcats football players
Players of American football from Georgia (U.S. state)
Georgia Tech Yellow Jackets football players
Washington Commanders players